Viguiera media is a species of flowering plant in the family Asteraceae. It is found only in Ecuador. Its natural habitat is saline lakes. It is threatened by habitat loss.

References

media
Aquatic plants
Endemic flora of Ecuador
Halophytes
Critically endangered flora of South America
Taxonomy articles created by Polbot